Baklan is a rural locality (a selo) in Pochepsky District, Bryansk Oblast, Russia. The population was 963 as of 2010. There are 11 streets.

Geography 
Baklan is located 36 km southwest of Pochep (the district's administrative centre) by road. Oktyabrsky is the nearest rural locality.

References 

Rural localities in Pochepsky District